Caprella kominatoensis is a species of skeleton shrimp in the genus Caprella. It was described in 1986 by Ichiro Takeuchi for specimens from Amatsu-Kominato (now part of Kamogawa), Chiba Prefecture, Japan, and is closely related to C. decipiens.

References

Corophiidea
Crustaceans described in 1986